Josip Franjo di Paola Nowak (5 September 1767 - 13 June 1844) was the Roman Catholic archbishop of the Archdiocese of Zadar.

Notes

Zadar
1767 births
1848 deaths
19th-century Roman Catholic archbishops in Croatia
Archbishops of Zadar